Instream use refers to water use taking place within a stream channel.  Examples are hydroelectric power generation, navigation, fish propagation and use, and recreational activities.  Some instream uses, usually associated with fish populations and navigation, require a minimum amount of water to be viable.

The term is often used in discussions concerning water resources allocation and/or water rights.

See also
Water law
International trade and water

References 

Hydrology
Water resources management